Quttinirpaaq National Park is located on the northeastern corner of Ellesmere Island in the Qikiqtaaluk Region of Nunavut, Canada. It is the second most northerly park on Earth after Northeast Greenland National Park. In Inuktitut, Quttinirpaaq means "top of the world". It was established as Ellesmere Island National Park Reserve in 1988, and the name was changed to Quttinirpaaq in 1999, when Nunavut was created, and became a national park in 2000.

The park is remarkable for its extensive glaciers and ice caps, desert-like conditions, and life forms that are uniquely adapted to the extreme polar environment. Only about 50 people visit the park each year.

Landscape 
The land is dominated by rock and ice. It is a polar desert with very little annual precipitation.

Much of the highlands of the park are covered in ice caps.  These ice caps, and the glaciers that descend from them, date back at least to the last episode of glaciation.

Wildlife 
Some wildlife, notably Arctic hares, lemmings, muskoxen and Arctic wolves reside in this national park, but sparse vegetation and low temperatures support only small populations. There is a very small Peary caribou population as well. Other animal inhabitants include ringed seals, bearded seals, walruses, polar bears, and narwhals. During summer months, birds nest in the park including semipalmated plovers, red knots, gyrfalcons and long-tailed jaegers. Common plants include dwarf willow, arctic willow, and Arctic cotton, in addition to grasses and lichens.  Plant and animal life is more concentrated in the Lake Hazen region, which has a milder climate than the surrounding ice cap-covered mountains and valleys.

Human history 
Due to its high latitude and limited wildlife, there has never been any significant human presence within this part of Ellesmere Island.  The pass from Tanquary Fiord through to Lake Hazen shows evidence of being used by Arctic people since about 5000 years ago.  Tent rings and food caches show that the area was visited by pre-Dorset, Dorset and Thule people, the ancestors of modern Inuit.

The east and north end of the island was used as a starting point for various polar explorations.  Fort Conger was an early Arctic exploration research base, and is now maintained as a Federal Heritage Building.

Park 
Parks Canada maintains warden stations and gravel air strips at Tanquary Fiord Airport, Lake Hazen and Ward Island. Tanquary Fiord and Lake Hazen are the main access points for tourists. Beyond these warden stations, there are no facilities within the park itself.

In 2004, the park was one of nine sites added to Canada's tentative list of potential World Heritage Sites.

The park was honoured on a postage stamp issued by Canada Post on January 14, 2019. It was a first-class rate stamp, issued at a value of 90 cents, and part of a nine-stamp definitive (regular) set issued the same day, in a series which debuted in 2018.

Gallery

See also

List of National Parks of Canada
List of protected areas of Nunavut
Arctic Cordillera

References

External links
Official site
NASA Earth Observatory page

Ellesmere Island
Parks in Qikiqtaaluk Region
Protected areas established in 1986
National parks in Nunavut
1986 establishments in the Northwest Territories
Territorial parks of Nunavut